Below is a list of computer science journals.

Alphabetic list of titles

A
 ACM Computing Reviews
 ACM Computing Surveys
 ACM Transactions on Algorithms
 ACM Transactions on Computational Logic
 ACM Transactions on Database Systems
 ACM Transactions on Graphics
 ACM Transactions on Information Systems
 ACM Transactions on Multimedia Computing, Communications, and Applications
 ACM Transactions on Programming Languages and Systems
 ACM Transactions on Software Engineering and Methodology
 Acta Informatica
 Adaptive Behavior
 ALGOL Bulletin
 Algorithmica
 Algorithms
 Applied Artificial Intelligence
 Archives of Computational Methods in Engineering
 Artificial Intelligence
 Astronomy and Computing
 Autonomous Agents and Multi-Agent Systems

B
 Journal of the Brazilian Computer Society

C
 Cluster Computing
 Code Words
 Cognitive Systems Research
 Combinatorica
 Combinatorics, Probability and Computing
 Communications of the ACM
 Computación y Sistemas
 Computational and Mathematical Organization Theory
 Computational Intelligence
 Computational Mechanics
 Computer Aided Surgery
 The Computer Journal
 Computer Law & Security Review
 Computer Networks
 Computer Science
 Computers & Graphics
 Computing
 Cybernetics and Human Knowing

D
 Data Mining and Knowledge Discovery
 Discrete Mathematics & Theoretical Computer Science
 Distributed Computing

E
 e-Informatica Software Engineering Journal
 Electronic Letters on Computer Vision and Image Analysis
 Electronic Notes in Theoretical Computer Science
 Electronic Proceedings in Theoretical Computer Science
 Empirical Software Engineering Journal
 EURASIP Journal on Advances in Signal Processing
 Evolutionary Computation

F
 First Monday
 Formal Aspects of Computing
 Foundations and Trends in Communications and Information Theory
 Foundations and Trends in Computer Graphics and Vision
 Foundations and Trends in Theoretical Computer Science
 Fundamenta Informaticae
 Fuzzy Sets and Systems

H
 Higher-Order and Symbolic Computation
 Hipertext.net

I
 ICGA Journal
 IEEE/ACM Transactions on Networking
 IEEE Annals of the History of Computing
 IEEE Intelligent Systems
 IEEE Internet Computing
 IEEE Micro
 IEEE MultiMedia
 IEEE Software
 IEEE Transactions on Computers
 IEEE Transactions on Control Systems Technology
 IEEE Transactions on Evolutionary Computation
 IEEE Transactions on Fuzzy Systems
 IEEE Transactions on Information Forensics and Security
 IEEE Transactions on Information Theory
 IEEE Transactions on Learning Technologies
 IEEE Transactions on Mobile Computing
 IEEE Transactions on Multimedia
 IEEE Transactions on Neural Networks and Learning Systems
 IEEE Transactions on Pattern Analysis and Machine Intelligence
 IEEE Transactions on Software Engineering
 IEEE Transactions on Visualization and Computer Graphics
 The Imaging Science Journal
 Information and Computation
 Information and Software Technology
 Information Processing Letters
 Information Services & Use
 Information Systems
 Information Systems Journal
 Innovations in Systems and Software Engineering
 International Institute for Advanced Studies in Systems Research and Cybernetics
 International Journal of Advanced Computer Technology
 International Journal of Applied Mathematics and Computer Science
 International Journal of Computational Geometry and Applications
 International Journal of Computational Intelligence and Applications
 International Journal of Computational Methods
 International Journal of Computer Assisted Radiology and Surgery
 International Journal of Computer Processing of Languages
 International Journal of Computer Vision
 International Journal of Cooperative Information Systems
 International Journal of Creative Computing
 International Journal of Data Warehousing and Mining
 International Journal of e-Collaboration
 International Journal of Foundations of Computer Science
 International Journal of High Performance Computing Applications
 International Journal of Image and Graphics
 International Journal of Information Acquisition
 International Journal of Information Technology & Decision Making
 International Journal of Innovation and Technology Management
 International Journal of Intelligent Information Technologies
 International Journal of Mathematics and Computer Science
 International Journal of Mobile and Blended Learning
 International Journal of Modelling and Simulation
 International Journal of Pattern Recognition and Artificial Intelligence
 International Journal of Shape Modeling
 International Journal of Software and Informatics
 International Journal of Software Engineering and Knowledge Engineering
 International Journal of Uncertainty, Fuzziness and Knowledge-Based Systems
 International Journal of Wavelets, Multiresolution and Information Processing
 International Journal of Web Services Research
 International Journal of Wireless Information Networks
 International Journal on Artificial Intelligence Tools
 International Journal on Semantic Web and Information Systems
 Internet Histories

J
 Journal of Advances in Information Fusion
 Journal of Artificial Intelligence Research
 Journal of Automata, Languages and Combinatorics
 Journal of Automated Reasoning
 Journal of Bioinformatics and Computational Biology
 Journal of Cases on Information Technology
 Journal of Chemical Information and Modeling
 Journal of Cheminformatics
 Journal of Circuits, Systems, and Computers
 Journal of Communications and Networks
 Journal of Computational Geometry
 Journal of Computer and System Sciences
 Journal of Computer-Mediated Communication
 Journal of Computing Sciences in Colleges
 Journal of Cryptology
 Journal of Database Management
 Journal of Experimental and Theoretical Artificial Intelligence
 Journal of Formalized Reasoning
 Journal of Functional Programming
 Journal of Global Information Management
 Journal of Graph Algorithms and Applications
 Journal of Graphics Tools
 Journal of Grid Computing
 Journal of Information Technology & Politics
 Journal of Intelligent and Robotic Systems
 Journal of Interconnection Networks
 Journal of Logic and Computation
 Journal of Logical and Algebraic Methods in Programming
 Journal of Machine Learning Research
 Journal of Multimedia
 The Journal of Object Technology
Journal of Organizational and End User Computing
 Journal of Software: Evolution and Process
 Journal of Statistical Software
 Journal of Strategic Information Systems
 The Journal of Supercomputing
 Journal of Symbolic Computation
 Journal of Systems and Software
 Journal of the ACM
 Journal of Web Semantics

K
 Kybernetes

L
 Logical Methods in Computer Science

M
 Machine Learning
 Machine Vision and Applications
 Mathematics and Computer Education
 Minds and Machines
 Mobile Computing and Communications Review
 Molecular Informatics

N
 Natural Computing
 Neural Networks
 Neurocomputing

P
 Parallel Processing Letters
 Pattern Recognition Letters
 PeerJ Computer Science
 Performance Evaluation
 Personal and Ubiquitous Computing
 Presence: Teleoperators & Virtual Environments
 Probability in the Engineering and Informational Sciences
 Proceedings of the IEEE
 Program: Electronic Library and Information Systems

R
 ReCALL

S
 Science Software Quarterly
Scientific Computing & Instrumentation
 SIAM Journal on Computing
 SIAM Journal on Scientific Computing
 Simulation & Gaming
 Software and Systems Modeling
 Software Testing, Verification & Reliability

T
 Theoretical Computer Science
 Theoretical Issues in Ergonomics Science
 Transactions on Aspect Oriented Software Development
 TUGboat

See also
Databases
 arXiv
 DBLP (Digital Bibliography & Library Project in computer science)
 The Collection of Computer Science Bibliographies
Lists
 List of important publications in computer science
 List of computer science conferences
 List of computer science conference acronyms
 List of open problems in computer science
 List of mathematics journals
Categories
 Biomedical informatics journals
 Computational statistics journals
 Cryptography journals
 Human–computer interaction journals
 Systems journals

External links
 Top journals in computer science, Times Higher Education, 14 May 2009
 Journal Rankings – Computer Science
 Top 650 Journals of Computer Science

Lists of academic journals